Ronald Sanders may refer to:
 Ronald Sanders (film editor), Canadian film editor and television producer
 Ronald Sanders (diplomat) (born 1948), Antiguan Barbudan academic, diplomat and journalist
 Ronald Sanders (writer) (1932–1991), American journalist and writer

See also
Ron Saunders (1932–2019), English football player and manager
Ron Saunders (politician), American politician
Ron Saunders (producer), Australian film and television producer, writer and director